Cola hypochrysea is a species of flowering plant in the family Malvaceae. It is found in Cameroon and Nigeria. It is threatened by habitat loss.

References

hypochrysea
Flora of Cameroon
Flora of Nigeria
Vulnerable flora of Africa
Taxonomy articles created by Polbot